is a Japanese writer of light novels. In 2003. Igarashi won the Grand Prize in the fourth Dengeki hp Novella Prize held by MediaWorks for his novella Shiawase Nisei Taidōkyo Keikaku: Yōsei-san no Ohanashi. The following year in 2004, Igarashi debuted with his light novel series Nogizaka Haruka no Himitsu. His hobbies include playing the piano, and cooking. He is also the author for the light novel series Hanikami Triangle.

References

Japanese writers
Living people
Year of birth missing (living people)